Baxstrom v. Herold, 383 U.S. 107 (1966), was a case decided by the Supreme Court of the United States that held that civil commitment following a prison term does not run afoul of double jeopardy principles.

References

External links 
 Full text of the opinion from Justia.com

United States Supreme Court cases
United States Double Jeopardy Clause case law
1966 in United States case law
United States Supreme Court cases of the Warren Court